Rosemarie Vargas is a Filipino volleyball player of the collegiate varsity volleyball team of Far Eastern University that plays in the University Athletic Association of the Philippines. Rosemarie also plays for the Creamline Cool Smashers in the Premier Volleyball League that debuted during the 2017 PVL Reinforced Conference.

Personal life 
Vargas was born on Olangapo City, Zambales on December 12 1992. She took a degree in Education at  Far Eastern University and finished it at 2013.

Career 
Because of her power to hit the wall using her hands, her friends saw a potential on her as a volleyball player. Vargas was recruited by former FEU Lady Tamaraws volleyball team coach Nestor Pamilar. After being recruited as a varsity volleyball player of the university, she became part of Far Eastern University women's volleyball team. Vargas debuted as a Lady Tamaraws in UAAP Season 72.  

Vargas won the Best Scorer award in the UAAP Season 74 volleyball tournaments. She did not finish her five playing years in the UAAP. She played for the powerhouse team Cagayan Valley Lady Rising Suns in 2013 that won the championships of 2013 open conference and 2014 reinforced conference, and runners-up finish in the Shakey's V-League.

After the team Cagayan was dissolved, she transferred to Pocari Sweat Lady Warriors in 2016 and played in the Shakey's V-League 13th Season Open Conference that won the championship.

Because of lack of playing time in the Pocari Sweat Lady Warriors, Vargas decided to change team to Bureau of Customs Transformers. She and Alyssa Valdez led the team on bringing a podium finish to the team.

From 2017 up to now, she is playing for the Creamline Cool Smashers. Her team finished two bronze medal in the 2017 PVL Season. Vargas was expected to return in the UAAP volleyball court to continue her last playing year for the Far Eastern University.

Awards

Individuals 
 UAAP Season 74 "Best Scorer"

Club 
 2013 Shakey's V-League 10th Season Open Conference -  Champions, with Cagayan Valley Lady Rising Suns
 2016 Shakey's V-League 13th Season Open Conference -  Champions, with Pocari Sweat Lady Warriors
 2016 Shakey's V-League 13th Season Reinforced Open Conference-  Silver medal, with Bureau of Customs Transformers
 2017 Premier Volleyball League 1st Season Reinforced Open Conference -  Bronze medal, with Creamline Cool Smashers
 2017 Premier Volleyball League 1st Season Open Conference -  Bronze medal, with Creamline Cool Smashers
 2019 PVL Reinforced Conference -  Runner-up, with Creamline Cool Smashers
 2019 PVL Open Conference -   Champions, with Creamline Cool Smashers
 2021 Premier Volleyball League Open Conference –  Runner-up with Creamline Cool Smashers
 2022 PVL Open Conference –  Champions, with Creamline Cool Smashers
 2022 PVL Invitational Conference -   Champions, with Creamline Cool Smashers
 2022 Premier Volleyball League Reinforced Conference -  Bronze medal, with Creamline Cool Smashers

References 

1992 births
Living people
Filipino women's volleyball players
University Athletic Association of the Philippines volleyball players
Sportspeople from Olongapo
Wing spikers
Outside hitters